Jean Duvignaud (22 February 1921 – 17 February 2007) was a French novelist, sociologist and anthropologist. He was born in La Rochelle, Charente-Maritime, on February 22, 1921.

Duvignaud was a secondary school teacher first at Abbeville, then at Étampes (1947–1956), where he taught Georges Perec. After submitting his doctoral thesis, he taught at the University of Tours. In 1972, he founded the magazine Cause commune with Georges Perec and Paul Virilio. For a time he was in a relationship with Clara Malraux, the ex-wife of novelist André Malraux.

He died (aged 85) in La Rochelle on February 17, 2007.

Bibliography

 L'Acteur, esquisse d'une sociologie du comédien, Paris, Gallimard, 1965. Rééd. L'Archipel, 1995 
 Durkheim, sa vie, son œuvre, Paris, PUF, 1965
 Visites d'Atelier Marta Pan, Cimaise, N.87, Juin Spetembre 1968
 Sociologie du théâtre, Paris, PUF, 1965. Rééd. Quadrige, 1999 
 Georges Gurvitch, symbolisme social et sociologie dynamique, Paris, Seghers, 1969
 Anthologie des sociologues français contemporains, Paris, PUF, 1970
 Spectacle et société, Paris, Denoël, 1970
 Introduction à la sociologie, Paris, Gallimard, 1971
 Sociologie de l'art, Paris, PUF, 1972
 L'Anomie, hérésie et subversion, Paris, Anthropos, 1973
 Le Langage perdu, essai sur la différence anthropologique, Paris, PUF, 1973
 Fêtes et civilisations, Paris, Weber, 1974
 Le Théâtre contemporain, culture et contre-culture, Paris, Larousse, 1974 
 Le Ça perché, Paris, Stock, 1976
 Le Don du rien, essai d'anthropologie de la fête, Paris, Plon, 1977
 Le Jeu du jeu, Paris, Balland, 1980 
 L' Or de la République, Paris, Gallimard, 1984 
 Le Propre de l'homme, histoires du comique et de la dérision, Paris, Hachette, 1985 
 La Solidarité, liens de sang et liens de raison, Paris, Fayard, 1986 
 Chebika, étude sociologique, Paris, Gallimard, 1978. Rééd. Paris, Plon, 1990 
 La Genèse des passions dans la vie sociale, Paris, PUF, 1990 
 Dis l'Empereur, qu'as-tu fait de l'oiseau ?, Arles, Actes Sud, 1991 
 Fêtes et civilisations ; suivi de La fête aujourd'hui, Arles, Actes Sud, 1991 
 Perec ou La cicatrice, Arles, Actes Sud, 1993 
 Le singe patriote. Talma, un portrait imaginaire (novel), Arles, Actes Sud, 1993 
 L'oubli ou La chute des corps, Arles, Actes Sud, 1995 
 Le pandémonium du présent, idées sages, idées folles, Paris, Plon, 1998 
 Le prix des choses sans prix, Arles, Actes Sud, 2001 
 Les octos, béant aux choses futures, Arles, Actes Sud, 2003 
 Le sous-texte, Arles, Actes Sud, 2005 
 La ruse de vivre, état des lieux, Arles, Actes Sud, 2006

References

External links
 Commemoration by Laurent Vidal published in Le Monde on 21 February 2007
 Interview with Duvignaud from the Institut d'urbanisme de Paris

1921 births
2007 deaths
People from La Rochelle
Academic staff of the University of Tours
French anthropologists
20th-century French novelists
21st-century French novelists
French sociologists
French male novelists
20th-century anthropologists
Sociologists of art